An artist is a person engaged in an activity related to creating art, practicing the arts, or demonstrating an art. The common usage in both everyday speech and academic discourse refers to a practitioner in the visual arts only. However, the term is also often used in the entertainment business, especially in a business context, for musicians and other performers (although less often for actors). "Artiste" (French for artist) is a variant used in English in this context, but this use has become rare. Use of the term "artist" to describe writers is valid, but less common, and mostly restricted to contexts like used in criticism.

Dictionary definitions
The Oxford English Dictionary defines the older broad meanings of the term "artist":

 A learned person or Master of Arts.
 One who pursues a practical science, traditionally medicine, astrology, alchemy, chemistry.
 A follower of a pursuit in which skill comes by study or practice.
 A follower of a manual art, such as a mechanic.
 One who makes their craft a fine art.
 One who cultivates one of the fine arts – traditionally the arts presided over by the muses.

History of the term
The Greek word "", often translated as "art," implies mastery of any sort of craft. The adjectival Latin form of the word, "",
became the source of the English words technique, technology, and technical.

In Greek culture, each of the nine Muses oversaw a different field of human creation:
 Calliope (the 'beautiful of speech'): chief of the muses and muse of epic or heroic poetry
 Clio (the 'glorious one'): muse of history
 Erato (the 'amorous one'): muse of love or erotic poetry, lyrics, and marriage songs
 Euterpe (the 'well-pleasing'): muse of music and lyric poetry
 Melpomene (the 'chanting one'): muse of tragedy
 Polyhymnia or Polymnia (the '[singer] of many hymns'): muse of sacred song, oratory, lyric, singing, and rhetoric
 Terpsichore (the '[one who] delights in dance'): muse of choral song and dance
 Thalia (the 'blossoming one'): muse of comedy and bucolic poetry
 Urania (the 'celestial one'): muse of astronomy

No muse was identified with the visual arts of painting and sculpture. In ancient Greece sculptors and painters were held in low regard, somewhere between freemen and slaves, their work regarded as mere manual labour.

The word art derives from the Latin "" (stem art-), which, although literally defined means "skill method" or "technique", also conveys a connotation of beauty.

During the Middle Ages the word artist already existed in some countries such as Italy, but the meaning was something resembling craftsman, while the word artisan was still unknown. An artist was someone able to do a work better than others, so the skilled excellency was underlined, rather than the activity field. In this period, some "artisanal" products (such as textiles) were much more precious and expensive than paintings or sculptures.

The first division into major and minor arts dates back at least to the works of Leon Battista Alberti (1404–1472): De re aedificatoria, De statua, De pictura, which focused on the importance of the intellectual skills of the artist rather than the manual skills (even if in other forms of art there was a project behind).

With the academies in Europe (second half of 16th century) the gap between fine and applied arts was definitely set.

Many contemporary definitions of "artist" and "art" are highly contingent on culture, resisting aesthetic prescription, in much the same way that the features constituting beauty and the beautiful cannot be standardized easily without moving into kitsch.

Training and employment 
The US Bureau of Labor Statistics classifies many visual artists as either craft artists or fine artists.  A craft artist makes handmade functional works of art, such as pottery or clothing.  A fine artist makes paintings, illustrations (such as book illustrations or medical illustrations), sculptures, or similar artistic works primarily for their aesthetic value.

The main source of skill for both craft artists and fine artists is long-term repetition and practice.  Many fine artists have studied their art form at university, and some have a master's degree in fine arts.  Artists may also study on their own or receive on-the-job training from an experienced artist.

The number of available jobs as an artist is increasing more slowly than other fields.  About half of US artists are self-employed.  Others work in a variety of industries.  For example, a pottery manufacturer will employ craft artists, and book publishers will hire illustrators.

In the US, fine artists have a median income of approximately US$50,000 per year, and craft artists have a median income of approximately US$33,000 per year.  This compares to US$61,000 for all art-related fields, including related jobs such as graphic designers, multimedia artists, animators, and fashion designers.  Many artists work part-time as artists and hold a second job.

See also

 Art
 Art history
 Arts by region
 Artist in Residence
 Fine art
 Humanities
 List of painters by name
 List of painters
 List of composers
 List of sculptors
 List of sketches of notable people by Marguerite Martyn
 Mathematics and art
 Social science

Notes

References

 P.Galloni, Il sacro artefice. Mitologie degli artigiani medievali, Laterza, Bari, 1998
 C. T. Onions (1991). The Shorter Oxford English Dictionary. Clarendon Press Oxford.

External links

 

Aesthetics
 
Art occupations
Arts-related lists
Humanities occupations
Artisans